Go Live (stylized in all caps) is the debut studio album by South Korean boy group Stray Kids. It was released by JYP Entertainment on June 17, 2020, and distributed through Dreamus. The lead single, "God's Menu", was released the same day. The reissue edition of the album, titled In Life (stylized in all caps) was released on September 14, 2020, along with eight new tracks, including lead single "Back Door".

Background and release 
On May 27, 2020, the group announced the upcoming release of Go Live, their first full-length album to be released on June 17, 2020, on their official Twitter account. Members Bang Chan, Changbin, and Han were heavily involved in the writing and production of the album under the helm "3Racha".

The title of the album, pronounced gosaeng in Korean, translates to hardship, relating to one of the core themes of the album. The English title of the album references the group's desire to continue moving forward and living without inhibition. Members of the group stated that this project involved experimentation with a variety of genres ranging from trap, hip hop, acoustic rock, and EDM.

Commercial performance 
Go Live debuted atop the weekly Gaon Album Chart, and also at number five on the monthly chart with 243,462 copies sold, becoming Stray Kids's best-selling album. As of August 2020, the album received certification from Gaon Chart as a Platinum-sales album (sold more than 250,000 copies), become the group's first album to do so.

The single "God's Menu" debut at number 144 on Gaon Weekly Download Chart, become the group's first single to appear on the chart, and also their first single to appear on the main category of digital chart of Gaon (Digital, Download, and Streaming).

Track listing 

Notes
 "Go Live" and "Ta" are stylized in all caps.
 Pronunciation and translation of Korean tracks' title:
 "" pronounces Gosaeng.
 "" pronounces Shinme-nyu.
 "" pronounces Bihaenggi.
 "" (Ilsang) means "daily life".
 "" pronounces Cheongsajin.
 "" (Baborado ara) means "even a fool knows".
 "" pronounces Tokkiwa Geobugi.
 "" (Ani) means "no".
 "" (Michin nom) means "crazy person" (insult word in Korean).

Credits and personnel

Credits adapted from Melon.

Go Live

In Life

Note: Only new tracks (1–8)

Charts

Weekly charts

Year-end charts

Single charts

Certifications

Accolades

Release history

Notes

References 

2020 debut albums
IRiver albums
JYP Entertainment albums
Korean-language albums
Stray Kids albums